Harold Fergie Woods  (1883 – 15 January 1961) was an English physician, homeopath and anti-vivisection activist.

Biography

Woods qualified L.R.C.P. and M.R.C.S. from Middlesex Hospital in 1908. After he qualified he went to the United States with John Weir to study homeopathy under James Tyler Kent. Woods had a long career at the Royal London Homeopathic Hospital where he was Resident Medical Officer, Physician for Diseases of Children and a Consulting Physician. In 1925, he co-founded the International Homoeopathic League.

Woods was a staunch opponent of vaccination and vivisection. He was a member of the British Union for the Abolition of Vivisection and gave speeches at anti-vivisection meetings. He stated that animal experimentation is scientifically useless and unethical as the animals are kept in mutilated and suffering conditions for considerable periods. Woods concluded that abolition of vivisection is the only way to protect animals. He was a Vice-President of the National Anti-Vaccination League. In 1945, Woods signed a petition for the formation of a group of homeopathy within the British Medical Association.

Woods was a germ theory denialist who held the view that germs were the result, not the cause of disease.

Woods died on January 15, 1961.

Selected publications

 Homoeopathic Treatment in the Nursery (1948)
 Essentials of Homoeopathic Prescribing with Rapid Repertory (1949)

See also

List of homeopaths

References

1883 births
1961 deaths
20th-century English medical doctors
Anti-vivisectionists
British anti-vaccination activists
British homeopaths
English animal rights activists
Germ theory denialists